Jaqueline Landolt is a former Swiss female curler. She played skip position on the Swiss rink that won .

Teams

Women's

Mixed

References

External links
 

Living people

Swiss female curlers
European curling champions
Swiss curling champions
Year of birth missing (living people)